Lenoir Grammar School, also known as East Harper School, is a historic elementary school building located at Lenoir, Caldwell County, North Carolina.  It was built in 1927, and is a two-story, five bay, Classical Revival-style brick school.  Additions were made in 1951-1952 and 1958.  The school was closed after a fire in 1987, and renovated into apartments in the 1990s.

The house was listed on the National Register of Historic Places in 2006.

References

School buildings on the National Register of Historic Places in North Carolina
Neoclassical architecture in North Carolina
School buildings completed in 1927
Buildings and structures in Caldwell County, North Carolina
National Register of Historic Places in Caldwell County, North Carolina
1927 establishments in North Carolina